Poshtkuh or Posht-e Kuh or Posht Kuh or Posht Kooh may refer to:

Poshtkuh, Fars
Posht-e Kuh, Hormozgan
Poshtkuh-e Abdan, Hormozgan Province
Poshtkuh-e Chakuy, Hormozgan Province
Poshtkuh, Anbarabad, Kerman Province
Poshtkuh, Rafsanjan, Kerman Province
Posht Kuh, Kohgiluyeh and Boyer-Ahmad
Poshtkuh, Markazi
Poshtkuh District, in Fars Province
Poshtkuh Rural District (disambiguation)
Poshtkuh-e Mugui Rural District, in Isfahan Province